Yam (also Romanized as Yām) is a village in Tarand Rural District, Jalilabad District, Pishva County, Tehran Province, Iran. At the 2006 census, its population was 346, in 92 families.

References 

Populated places in Pishva County